Nathan Robert Raduns (born May 17, 1984) is an American former professional ice hockey player. He played in one National Hockey League (NHL) game with the Philadelphia Flyers during the  season. During his professional career he also played two seasons in the American Hockey League (AHL) with the Worcester Sharks and Philadelphia Phantoms, and one season in Italy with SG Pontebba.

Playing career
Undrafted, Raduns was a standout high school player with Sauk Rapids-Rice High School until his sophomore season, when he left to play with the USA Hockey National Team Development Program. As a high school senior, Raduns then opted to move to the River City Lancers of the USHL in 2002-03 before being recruited to  play collegiate hockey with St. Cloud State University of the Western Collegiate Hockey Association. After his four-year career with the Huskies he was invited to the San Jose Sharks rookie training camp for the 2007–08 season. He was then reassigned to AHL affiliate, the Worcester Sharks, where he remained for the duration of the year.

On July 1, 2008, Raduns signed a one-year contract with the Philadelphia Flyers prior to the 2008–09 season. He was then assigned to AHL affiliate, the Philadelphia Phantoms and fulfilled a checking-line role, scoring 14 points in 70 games. On November 6, 2008, he made his NHL debut appearing in 1 game with the Flyers in a 4-1 defeat to the Ottawa Senators.

Raduns signed a contract with SG Pontebba of the Italian Serie A on July 7, 2009, for the 2009–10 season.

Career statistics

Regular season and playoffs

International

See also
 List of players who played only one game in the NHL

References

External links
 

1984 births
Living people
American men's ice hockey right wingers
Ice hockey players from Minnesota
People from Sauk Rapids, Minnesota
Philadelphia Flyers players
Philadelphia Phantoms players
River City Lancers players
SG Pontebba players
St. Cloud State Huskies men's ice hockey players
Undrafted National Hockey League players
Worcester Sharks players